This is a list of rivers of Saint Kitts and Nevis. Only Cayon and Wingfield are permanent rivers, all other rivers listed are intermittent.  There are six permanent streams and 53 intermittent streams in Saint Kitts and Nevis.

Saint Kitts
The following streams are located on Saint Kitts:
Cayon, 
Christ Church Ghut, 
Cranstowns Gut (permanent stream), 
Fancy River (permanent stream), 
Lavingtons Gut (permanent stream), 
Lodge Ghut, 
Moliness Gut (permanent stream), 
Ottleys Ghut, 
Parsons Ghut, 
Pelhams (Stone Fort River), 
Wingfields River (permanent stream),

Nevis
The following intermittent stream is located on Nevis: 
Camp, 
New River Ghut, 
Sulphur Ghut (permanent stream),

References

GEOnet Names Server

Tourist Map
Water Resources Assessment of Dominica, Antigua, Barbuda, St. Kitts and Nevis

R
Saint Kitts and Nevis
Rivers of Saint Kitts and Nevis
S